Nkaiti is an administrative ward in the Babati district of the Manyara Region of Tanzania. According to the 2012 census, the ward has a total population of 14,150.

References

Babati District
Wards of Manyara Region